Crown Princess Gonghoe of the Musong Yun clan (Hangul: 공회빈 윤씨, Hanja: 恭懷嬪 尹氏; 11 July 1553 - 14 April 1592) or sometimes called as Yun Gonghoe-bin was a Joseon Crown Princess Consort as the wife of Crown Prince Sunhoe, the only son of Myeongjong of Joseon and Queen Insun.

Biography

Early life and relatives
The future Crown Princess Gonghoe was born in 1553, she was from the Musong Yun clan (무송 윤씨) as the daughter of Yun Ok and Lady Yun of the Papyeong Yun clan. Lady Yun was the third child of five children. 

She later chosen as the consort of Myeongjong of Joseon and Queen Insun's only son, Yi Bu, Crown Prince Sunhoe. He actually already had a wife, Crown Princess Hwang, but after it was discovered that she had colic disease, Hwang was demoted to a concubine. Thus having Yun change her position and become the new crown princess consort.

As Crown Princess and later life
In 1563, 18th year of King Myeongjong's reign, the Crown Prince died young, she became widowed at 10 years old and was named Crown Princess Consort Deok or Consort Deok (덕빈, 德嬪).

She still stayed and lived in the palace even after her husband's death under her mother-in-law, Queen Insun's order. Yun often offered Buddhist rituals to pray for the spirits of her husband. Later, she died in Tongmyeong Hall, Changgyeong Palace on 3 March 1592.

Aftermath
After she died, the crown princess was given the posthumous name of Gonghoe (공회, 恭懷) and her burial palace is located in Sunchangwon (順昌園), Seooreung. Sunchangwon's original name was Sunhoemyo (順懷墓), but was renamed Sunchangwon during the Korean Empire. 

However prior to that, when Seonjo of Joseon returned to Hanyang in 1593 and tried to recover her body, he couldn't find it. At the time, it was rumored that Yi Chung (이충, 李忠) buried her body in Hamchunwon (함춘원, 含春苑), but because Yi had already died, King Seonjo asked Yun’s younger brother, Yun Baek-sang, to find her body. He did not have luck finding it.

In 1594, King Seonjo sent officials and soldiers to prepare the ancestral rites of the Crown Prince and Princess.

Family 
 Father - Yun Ok (윤옥, 尹玉) (1511 - 1584)
 Grandfather - Yun Sa-ik (윤사익, 尹思翼) (1478 - 1563)
 Grandmother - Lady Jeong of the Dongrae Jeong clan (동래 정씨, 東來 鄭氏) (? - 1545); daughter of Jeong Se-geol (정세걸, 鄭世傑)
 Mother - Lady Yun of the Paepyeong Yun clan (파평 윤씨, 坡平 尹氏) (? - 1572)
 Grandfather - Yun Bong-jong (윤봉종, 尹奉宗)
 Grandmother - Lady Kim of the Andong Kim clan (안동 김씨, 安東 金氏); daughter of Kim Gye-ham (김계함, 金季諴)
 Sibling(s)
 Older sister - Lady Yun of the Musong Yun clan (무송 윤씨) (1539 - ?)
 Brother-in-law - Gu Sa-yeol (구사열)
 Older brother - Yun Baek-sun (윤백순, 尹百順) (1552 - ?)
 Younger sister - Lady Yun of the Musong Yun clan (무송 윤씨) (1555 - 1637)
 Brother-in-law - Yi Ahn-seong (이안성) of the Deoksu Yi clan
 Nephew - Yi Sik (이식, 李植) (1584 - 1647)
 Niece-in-law - Lady Sim of the Cheongsong Sim clan (청송 심씨, 靑松 沈氏) (1585 - 1658)
 Younger half-brother - Yun Baek-sang (윤백상) (? - 1621)
 Husband - Yi Bu, Crown Prince Sunhoe (순회세자 이부) (1 July 1551 - 6 October 1563) — No issue.
 Mother-in-law - Queen Insun of the Cheongsong Sim clan (인순왕후 심씨) (27 June 1532 - 12 December 1575)
 Father-in-law - Yi Hwan, King Myeongjong (조선 명종) (3 July 1534 - 2 August 1567)

References

External links

16th-century Korean people
1552 births
1592 deaths
16th-century Korean women
Musong Yun clan